Heinrich Schönfeld (3 August 1900 – 3 September 1976) was an Austrian footballer who played as a forward, and football manager.

Club career
Nicknamed "Beppo", Schönfeld was born in Kolozsvár, Austria-Hungary, and was Jewish.  He made his professional debut as a goalkeeper in 1916 at 16 years of age for Austrian team SpC Rudolfshügel, but was later converted into a striker. He moved to Sportclub Meran in 1921.

In 1923, Schönfeld moved to Italian side Torino. There, he became the top scorer in the 1923–1924 Serie A, scoring 22 goals, in 20 games, as he scored 51.1% of this team's goals. He spent one season with Inter Milan.  He returned to Austria in 1926 with Hakoah Vienna.  In 1926, he played a tour in the United States with Hakoah.

He later spent time playing in the American Soccer League with Brooklyn Wanderers, Brooklyn Hakoah, and New York Hakoah. He coached in Italy between 1930 and 1935 for Juventus Trapani and Catanzarese.

Schönfeld emigrated to Canada with his wife Elisabeth in 1952. He died in Toronto on 3 September 1976.

References

External links
 Profile at Inter Archive

1900 births
1976 deaths
Sportspeople from Cluj-Napoca
People from the Kingdom of Hungary
Austro-Hungarian Jews
Austrian footballers
Inter Milan players
Torino F.C. players
Serie A players
Association football forwards
Footballers from Vienna
First Vienna FC players
Brooklyn Wanderers players
Brooklyn Hakoah players
New York Hakoah players
Hakoah All-Stars players
Trapani Calcio players
Jewish footballers
Jewish Austrian sportspeople
Austrian expatriate footballers
Austrian expatriate sportspeople in Italy
Austrian expatriate sportspeople in the United States
Austrian emigrants to Canada
Austrian expatriate football managers